The 2019–20 season was Scunthorpe United's 121st season in their existence and their first season back in League Two following relegation the previous season. Along with competing in League Two, the club also participated in the FA Cup, EFL Cup and EFL Trophy. The season covered the period from 1 July 2019 to 30 June 2020. Due to the COVID-19 pandemic in the United Kingdom the season was stopped.

Squad

Statistics

|-
!colspan=14|Players out on loan:

|-
!colspan=14|Players who left the club:

|}

Goals record

Disciplinary record

Pre-season
The Iron have confirmed pre-season friendlies against Dundee, Leicester City, West Bromwich Albion and Alfreton Town.

Competitions

League Two

League table

Results summary

Results by matchday

Matches
On Thursday, 20 June 2019, the EFL League Two fixtures were revealed.

FA Cup

The first round draw was made on 21 October 2019.

EFL Cup

The first round draw was made on 20 June.

EFL Trophy

On 9 July 2019, the pre-determined group stage draw was announced with Invited clubs to be drawn on 12 July 2019. The draw for the second round was made on 16 November 2019 live on Sky Sports. The third round draw was confirmed on 5 December 2019.

Transfers

Transfers in

Loans in

Loans out

Transfers out

Jamie ward

References

Scunthorpe United
Scunthorpe United F.C. seasons